"Big Ole Brew" is a song written by Russell Smith, and recorded by American country music artist, Mel McDaniel. It was released in June 1982 as the third single from his album Take Me to the Country. It peaked at both number 4 on the U.S. Billboard Hot Country Singles & Tracks chart and on the Canadian RPM Country Tracks chart. It was originally recorded by the American country rock band Amazing Rhythm Aces, whose version appeared on their 1980 album, How the Hell Do You Spell Rythum?.

Content
The song is a mid-tempo in which the narrator states that all he wants is a beer and his significant other.

Charts

Weekly charts

Year-end charts

Popular culture
In the beginning of the film Stripes, Bill Murray's character sings the line, "One of these days everything that I want's gonna be mine, But if it ain't that'll be alright as long as there's sunshine and a big ole brew." Since Stripes was released in 1981, he must have been quoting the original Amazing Rhythm Aces version from 1980.

References

1982 singles
Mel McDaniel songs
Songs written by Russell Smith (singer)
Capitol Records Nashville singles
1980 songs
The Amazing Rhythm Aces songs